The  is a DC electric multiple unit (EMU) train type formerly operated by Japanese National Railways (JNR), and currently operated on local services by West Japan Railway Company (JR West) in Japan since 1981. They were also formerly operated by East Japan Railway Company (JR East).

Overview
The 105 series was introduced in 1981 to replace early EMU types operating on the Fukuen Line, Ube Line, and Onoda Line in western Japan. The rural nature and low line speed of these lines meant that 101 series or 103 series commuter EMUs would have been unnecessarily over-powered with their high proportion of motored cars, and so the 105 series was designed with one motored car per two cars.

The first sets introduced were 105-0 series two-car sets which were newly built in 1981 with three pairs of doors per side. 105-500 series two-car sets were later introduced, converted from former 103 series EMU cars, with four pairs of doors per side.

As of 1 April 2012, 56 2-car sets are operated by JR-West, based at Hineno, Okayama, Shimonoseki, and Hiroshima depots.

105-0 series
60 105-0 series vehicles were built in 1981, formed as two-car sets for use on the Onoda Line and Ube Line, and four-car sets for use on the Fukuen Line. Initially, these sets were not equipped with air-conditioning.

Formations
These were originally formed as follows.

4-car sets

The KuMoHa and MoHa cars were each equipped with one lozenge-type pantograph.

2-car sets

The KuMoHa cars are equipped with one lozenge-type pantograph.

Interior
Seating accommodation consists of longitudinal bench seating throughout each car.

105-500/600 series

The 105-500/600 series variant was introduced from October 1984, coinciding with the electrification of the Nara Line between Kyoto and Nara, and the Wakayama Line between Wakayama and Gojō. Budget restraints prevented the construction of new trains, and instead, former Jōban Line 103-1000 series EMU cars made surplus by the introduction of 203 series EMUs were modified with the addition of new cab ends to form 2-car 105-500 series sets.

Senseki Line sets

In March 1987, four former 103 series air-conditioned driving cars were converted to become 2-car 105 series sets for use on the Senseki Line in the Sendai area. These sets retained the original non-gangwayed 103 series cab ends.

References

Electric multiple units of Japan
East Japan Railway Company
Train-related introductions in 1981
1500 V DC multiple units of Japan